Ronjini Chakraborty (born 24 February 1992) is an Indian actress and model. She has established her career in Hindi and Bengali films.

Personal life
Ronjini was born in a middle-class Bengali family on 8 December 1992 in Kolkata. She has been trained in the Indian Classical Music for 7 years during her adolescence. Her mother wanted her to be a singer, but her preference was acting. That's why she chose acting as her career. She started her acting journey while she was in college. She joined a theatre group named “Theatrecian” and did several theatre plays like ‘The Lesson’ directed by Eugene Ionesco, ‘No Exit’ directed by Jean-Paul Sartre, ‘The Home Coming’ directed by Harold Pinter, ‘The Goat’ directed by Edward Albee, and ‘The Comedy Kitchen’ adopted by Dhruv Mukherjee.
Then, she joined the FTII (Film and Television Institute of India) in Pune to do an acting course and to enhance her acting skills. After the completion of her training, she came back to Kolkata.

Career
After doing several Bengali films including Tears of Nandigram and  Trayadashi, she shifted to Mumbai. There, she started giving auditions and got selected for TV ads. She did several advertisements including Cadbury Celebration, Sony Mix Channel, Bharat Nirman, Yebhi.com, and 7Up.

In 2011, Ronjini was shortlisted for a Colors TV daily soap, “Na Bole Tum Na Maine Kuch Kaha,” but she couldn't be a part of the show as she got an offer for a movie, From Sydney with Love at the same time. From both choices, she opted for the movie.
In 2013, she made her appearance in a sitcom of Channel V named Paanch 5 Wrongs Make A Right She has also appeared in short films such as ‘A Perfect Day’ by Abhinandan Gupta (2011), ‘Just Friends’ by Arun Sukumar (2013), and ‘Blouse’ by Vijayeta Kumar (2014). She has appeared in various films, like Autohead (2016), Tumbbad (2018), Simmba (2018), and Article 15(2019). She has acted in many Hindi TV series, including ‘Man's World’ (2015), Stories by Rabindranath Tagore (2015), ‘Not Out’ (2016), ‘PA Gals’ (2017), ‘Lalbazaar’ (2020), Raktanchal (2020).

The Great Indian Murder(2022) and TVF Pitchers(2022).

Filmography

TV/Web Series

References 

1986 births
Living people
Indian film actresses
Indian television actresses
21st-century Indian actresses